Blythewood is a town in Richland and Fairfield counties, South Carolina, United States. It is a suburb of Columbia, South Carolina. The 2020 United States census puts the population at 4,772.  It is part of the Columbia, South Carolina, Metropolitan Statistical Area. It is located around 15 miles (24 kilometers) from downtown Columbia.

Blythewood Road is one of the main thoroughfares, intersecting Interstate 77 at Exit 27. U.S. Route 21 also goes through Blythewood, intersecting Interstate 77 at exit 24.

History
Blythewood was originally named "Doko", a Native American term for a watering place. The town was named after Doko Depot, which was a stop along the railroad that ran between Charlotte and Columbia. In 1865, this railroad was destroyed by General Sherman.  The town was rebuilt, and changed its name to Blythewood in 1877, after a local school called The Blythewood Female Institute. The school was later renamed "Blythewood Academy". 

The George P. Hoffman House, built in 1855, is the oldest extant house in Blythewood and is used as the city hall. It was added to the National Register of Historic Places in 1986.

Geography
Blythewood is located in the Piedmont region of South Carolina.

Climate
Climate is characterized by warm temperatures and moderate precipitation throughout the year.  The Köppen Climate Classification subtype for this climate is "Cfa" (Humid Subtropical Climate).

Demographics

2020 census

As of the 2020 United States census, there were 4,772 people, 1,057 households, and 920 families residing in the town.

2010
As of the census of 2010, there were 3,148 people, 996 households residing in the town. The population density was 209.7 people per square mile (81.0/km2). The average median age was 39.3 The racial makeup of the town was 55% White, 41% African American, and 1.0% Asian. Hispanic or Latino of any race were 3.0% of the population.

There were 723 households, out of which 42.5% had children under the age of 18 living with them, 71.0% were headed by married couples living together, 9.4% had a female householder with no husband present, and 15.9% were non-families. 13.4% of all households were made up of individuals, and 4.6% were someone living alone who was 65 years of age or older. The average household size was 2.81 and the average family size was 3.08.

In the town, the population was spread out, with 28% below the age of 19, 15% from 20 to 29, 8% 30-39, 16% 40-49, 18% 50-59 and 15% who were 60 years of age or older. The median age was 39.3 years. 49% male and 51% female.

The estimated median annual income for a household in the town was $90,444. The per capita income for the town was $38,077. About 1.4% of the population were below the poverty line, including 0.0% of those under the age of 18.

Economy
The US Headquarters for Spirax-Sarco Engineering is headquartered in Blythewood.

Education
Blythewood has a public library, a branch of the Richland County Library.

The schools in Richland School District 2 located directly in Blythewood are as follows: 

 Blythewood High School 
 Westwood High School 
 Blythewood Middle School    
 Muller Road Middle School 
 Bethel-Hanberry Elementary School   
 Round Top Elementary School 
 Langford Elementary School

Notable people
 Elizabeth Hawley Gasque - first woman from South Carolina elected to the United States Congress
 Justin Bethel - defensive back and special teams player for the Miami Dolphins
 Brandon Wilds - former NFL running back
 Amaré Barno - outside linebacker for the Carolina Panthers

References

External links
 Town of Blythewood official website

Towns in South Carolina
Towns in Fairfield County, South Carolina
Towns in Richland County, South Carolina
Columbia metropolitan area (South Carolina)